Batoporidae is a family of bryozoans belonging to the order Cheilostomatida.

Genera:
 Batopora Reuss, 1867
 Lacrimula Cook, 1966
 Ptoboroa Gordon & d'Hondt, 1997

References

Bryozoan families